Joseph Justyn Taylor (born January 4, 1998) is an American football running back, and return specialist for the New England Patriots of the National Football League (NFL) and professional Rocket League esports player of Team Oxygen. He played college football at Arizona.

Early years
Taylor graduated in 2016 from Centennial High School in Corona, California.After converting from Defensive back to Running back, he was named Mr. Football as state's top offensive player by CalHiSports.com. Also he was named All-Inland First-team. He was recognized as a Blue-Grey All-American. He gained 2,290 yards and 44 touchdowns as a senior. He earned a three-star recruit by Scout.com, Rivals.com and 247 Sports. Taylor had offers from Washington State, Nevada, Ohio, Montana State, Sacramento State and Weber State from the Big Sky Conference as well. Taylor committed to Arizona in 2015.

College career

2016 season
He played in four games with one career start before going down with an injury as a true freshman. Taylor rushed for 261 yards and two touchdowns on 38 carries, even though he barely played in Arizona's first game of the season against BYU. The best proof came in a two-game stretch where Taylor rushed for a combined 267 yards on 37 carries with two touchdowns, particularly in Arizona's dominant win over Hawaii in Week 3. Taylor was poised for a breakout freshman season before the injury in Pac-12 opener, which occurred during the Wildcats’ fourth game against Washington. He still totaled 97 yards on 19 carries with a touchdown.

2017 season
Taylor, a redshirt freshman from Corona, Calif., played in all 12 games and was the Pac-12's top freshman rusher with 828 yards (6.1 yards/carry), averaged 69.0 yards per game, and added five touchdowns. He rushed for a career-best 153 yards on 14 carries (10.9 avg.) with two touchdowns vs. Washington State. Taylor was a major contributor to Arizona's ground game that averaged 324.4 yards per game (3rd in the FBS) and a school single-season team record 48 rushing touchdowns. Arizona rushed for 300 or more yards seven times, including a pair of 500+ yard games with a UA single-game record 534 yards vs. Oregon State. He was the Pac-12 Offensive Freshman of the Year.

2018 season
Taylor was put on the Doak Walker Award watch list in July 2018. Against Southern Utah, Taylor returned a kickoff for a touchdown. His redshirt sophomore year finished with 1,434 rushing yards and, 49 receiving yards, and seven total touchdowns.

2019 season
As a redshirted junior in 2019, Taylor finished with 721 rushing yards and five touchdowns. On November 19, 2019, Taylor announced that we would forgo his senior year and enter the 2020 NFL Draft.

College statistics

Professional career

Taylor signed with the New England Patriots as an undrafted free agent on May 5, 2020. On September 5, 2020, he was waived by the team and signed to the practice squad the following day. He was promoted to the active roster on September 7, 2020. Taylor made his professional debut in the Patriots Week one victory over the Miami Dolphins.

On August 30, 2022, Taylor was waived by the Patriots and signed to the practice squad the next day. He was promoted to the active roster on November 5. He was waived on November 21 and re-signed to the practice squad. He signed a reserve/future contract on January 10, 2023.

NFL career statistics

Regular season

References

External links
 New England Patriots bio
 Arizona Wildcats bio

1998 births
American football running backs
Arizona Wildcats football players
Living people
Players of American football from California
Sportspeople from Corona, California
New England Patriots players